The men's singles luge competition at the 1992 Winter Olympics in Albertville was held on 9 and 10 February, at La Plagne.

Results

References

Luge at the 1992 Winter Olympics
Men's events at the 1992 Winter Olympics